The Curtiss CR was a racing aircraft designed for the United States Navy in 1921 by Curtiss. It was a conventional single-seater biplane with a monocoque fuselage and staggered single-bay wings of equal span braced with N-struts. Two essentially similar landplane versions were built as the CR-1 and CR-2, which were both eventually converted to seaplanes as the CR-3 in 1923 and CR-4 in 1924. A refined version was developed for the US Army Air Service under the designation R-6. These latter two aircraft featured refined aerodynamics included surface-mounted radiators.

Operational history

The Curtiss CRs enjoyed successful racing careers. Their first major win was at the 1921 Pulitzer Trophy race, where piloted by Bert Acosta the CR-1 took first place with an average speed of 176.75 mph (283.49 km/h), nearly two minutes ahead of its closest rival. The following year, this aircraft was modified and redesignated CR-2 and joined in the Pulitzer race by a second aircraft built to the same new standard, plus two R-6s flown by Army pilots. These Curtiss aircraft took first through fourth place, the two R-6s followed by the two CR-2s. The race was won by Lt. Russell Maughan with an average speed of 205.856 mph (330.172 km/h) with Lt. Lester Maitland in second place (198.850 mph/318.936 km/h). Maughan's effort incidentally broke every closed-circuit airspeed record up to 124 mi (200 km). The CR-2s took third and fourth places piloted by Lt Harold Brow (average speed 193.695 mph/310.667 km/h) and Lt Jg Al Williams (average speed 187.996 mph/301.527 km/h).

The Army built upon this success with the R-6s by using the aircraft to break the world airspeed record before 1922 was over, Gen Billy Mitchell flying one to 224.28 mph (359.72 km/h) on 18 October. In March the following year, an R-6 flown by Lt. Maughan lifted the record to 236.587 mph (380.74 km/h). The R-6 design was developed in 1923 into the longer-winged XPW-8, the prototype of the PW-8 fighter.

In 1923, the CR-2s were fitted with floats for the Schneider Trophy race and redesignated CR-3. The aircraft took first and second place, piloted by David Rittenhouse (average speed  and Rutledge Irvine . After the 1924 Schneider Trophy race was cancelled, CR-3 A6081 was flown by Lt. G.T. Cuuddihy to set up new World's closed-course seaplane record oc .

A6081 was further modified as the CR-4 for use as a test-bed and trainer for the 1926 Schneider Trophy racing team.

Variants
CR-1 the first CR with US Navy serial A6080, with Lamblin radiators between the undercarriage struts.
CR-2 the second CR A6081, fitted with streamlined wheels and wing surface radiators.
CR-3 both A6080 and A6081 were converted to CR-3 standard with floats and  Curtis D-12 5PL engines.
CR-4 CR-3 A6081, modified as a test-bed and trainer for the 1926 Schneider Trophy race team.

Operators

 United States Navy (CR)
 United States Army (R6)

Specifications (CR-3 Seaplane)

See also

References

Bibliography

External links

 hydroretro.net
 airracinghistory.freeola.com

Schneider Trophy
1920s United States sport aircraft
CR
Single-engined tractor aircraft
Biplanes
Aircraft first flown in 1921